Glow Stars is the debut studio album by Heather Nova, released in 1993.

Critical reception
AllMusic wrote: "'Ear to the Ground' and the title track shimmer with sweet acoustic guitars, while tracks like 'Bare' and 'Spirit in You' prance around dark melodies steeped in hollow dreamscapes."

Track listing
All songs written by Heather Nova.

"Bare" – 4:24
"My Fidelity" – 4:21
"Spirit in You" – 4:00
"Shell" – 4:10
"Glow Stars" – 3:07
"Ear to the Ground" – 4:40
"Second Skin" – 3:48
"Mothertongue" – 3:24
"All the Way" – 1:10
"Frontier" – 4:13
"Shaking the Doll" – 3:50
"Talking to Strangers" – 3:23

Personnel
Heather Nova – guitar, keyboards, vocals
David Ayers – guitar
Danny Hammond – guitar
Colin Payne – keyboards

Production
Felix Tod – producer, engineer, mixing
Colin Payne – string arrangements
Andy Vella – cover photo

References

Heather Nova albums
1993 debut albums